is a Prefectural Natural Park in south-central Nagano Prefecture, Japan. The park is wholly within the municipality of Ina.

See also
 National Parks of Japan

References

External links
  Map of the parks of Nagano Prefecture

Parks and gardens in Nagano Prefecture
Protected areas established in 1958
1958 establishments in Japan
Ina, Nagano